= Gurna indica =

Scientific classification
- Domain: Eukaryota
- Kingdom: Animalia
- Phylum: Arthropoda
- Class: Insecta
- Order: Lepidoptera
- Superfamily: Noctuoidea
- Family: Erebidae
- Subfamily: Arctiinae
- Tribe: Lithosiini
- Genus: Gurna
- Species: G. indica

Binomial name
- Gurna indica (Moore, 1879)

Synonyms
- Dysauxes indica Moore, 1879; Miltochrista indica (Moore, 1879)

Species of moth

Gurna indica is a species in the moth family Erebidae, found in India.
