= Gurna (moth) =

Scientific classification
- Kingdom: Animalia
- Phylum: Arthropoda
- Class: Insecta
- Order: Lepidoptera
- Superfamily: Noctuoidea
- Family: Erebidae
- Subfamily: Arctiinae
- Tribe: Lithosiini
- Genus: Gurna; Swinhoe, 1892
- Species: G. indica

Binomial name
- Gurna indica (Moore, 1879)

Genus of moths

Gurna is a genus in the moth family Erebidae. This genus has a single species, Gurna indica, found in India.
